Kandab may refer to:
 Kandab Bala
 Kandab Pain